The 1900 United States presidential election in Pennsylvania took place on November 6, 1900 as part of the 1900 United States presidential election. Voters chose 32 representatives, or electors to the Electoral College, who voted for president and vice president.

Pennsylvania overwhelmingly voted for the Republican nominee, President William McKinley, over the Democratic nominee, former U.S. Representative and 1896 Democratic presidential nominee William Jennings Bryan. McKinley won Pennsylvania by a landslide margin of 24.31% in this rematch of the 1896 United States presidential election. The return of economic prosperity and recent victory in the Spanish–American War helped McKinley to score a decisive victory.

With 60.74% of the popular vote, Pennsylvania would be McKinley's fourth strongest victory in terms of percentage in the popular vote after Vermont, North Dakota and Maine.

Results

Results by county

See also
 List of United States presidential elections in Pennsylvania

References

Pennsylvania
1900
1900 Pennsylvania elections